was a Japanese Type B1 submarine which saw service during World War II in the Imperial Japanese Navy. I-21 was the most successful Japanese submarine to operate in Australian waters, participating in the attack on Sydney Harbour in 1942 and sinking 44,000 tons of Allied shipping during her two deployments off the east coast of Australia.

Service history
The submarine was laid down on 7 January 1939 at the Kawasaki shipyard, Kobe, and launched on 24 February 1940. On 15 July 1941 she was completed, commissioned and assigned to Submarine Squadron 1's Submarine Division 3 in the Sixth Fleet. I-21 was based in the Yokosuka Naval District.

On 31 October 1941 Commander Matsumura Kanji was assigned as Commanding Officer, and on 10 November he attended a meeting of submarine commanders aboard the light cruiser , convened by Vice Admiral Mitsumi Shimizu, to be briefed on the planned attack on Pearl Harbor.

Attack on Pearl Harbor
I-21 departed Yokosuka on 19 November and sailed to the rendezvous at Hitokappu Bay, Etorofu, arriving on the 22nd, and departing on the 26th for the Hawaiian Islands, acting as a lookout ahead of the Carrier Striking Force. On 2 December 1941 the coded signal "Climb Mount Niitaka" was received, signifying that hostilities would commence on 8 December (Japan time). On 7 December 1941 I-21 was assigned to patrol north of Oahu, Hawaii.

I-21 and the rest of SubRon 1 boats, were ordered to pursue and sink her. However I-21s pursuit was delayed by diesel engine breakdowns and electrical problems. She was also spotted by several Douglas SBD Dauntless dive-bombers and forced to dive each time. Finally, on 14 December, the chase was abandoned and I-21 and the other submarines were ordered to the West Coast of the United States to attack American shipping. I-21 was assigned to patrol off Point Arguello, California.

Sinking of SS Montebello
On 23 December 1941, I-21 sighted the Union Oil Company's  oil tanker . The  vessel, built in 1921, was en route from Port San Luis, California, to Vancouver, British Columbia.

One was a dud, but the other struck forward in the pump room and dry storage cargo hold. The 38-man crew abandoned the tanker in four lifeboats, which were machine-gunned by I-21 with no casualties.

In November 1996, a team of marine researchers surveyed and filmed the wreck in a two-person submarine. The wreck was reexamined in 2010 for the level of deterioration and to determine if the oil was still in the hold and if so, did it pose an environmental threat. The researchers reported in October 2011 that the cargo had dissipated into the vast ocean shortly after sinking.

Shelling of Newcastle, Australia

On 8 June 1942, I-21 briefly shelled Newcastle, New South Wales. Among the areas hit within the city were dockyards and steel works. There were no casualties in the attack and damage was minimal.

Possible sinking of USS Porter

On 26 October 1942, in the Battle of the Santa Cruz Islands, I-21 is credited in most sources with sinking of the destroyer . However, author Richard B. Frank states that Japanese records do not support this, and that, more likely, an errant torpedo from a ditching U.S. Grumman TBF Avenger hit Porter and caused the fatal damage.

Sinking of SS Kalingo
Two firemen were killed when the torpedo hit, and 32 of her crew reached safety in a boat.

Sinking of SS Iron Knight
The BHP Shipping iron ore carrier  was part of a convoy of ten ships travelling up the east coast of New South Wales on 8 February 1943. At approximately 2:30 am, north of Twofold Bay, I-21 fired a torpedo at the naval ships flanking Iron Knight at the head of the flotilla under cover of darkness. Most of the ship's crew were below decks and were unable to escape as the ship went down. , the other corvette guarding the convoy, pursued the I-21 for several days.

Local fishermen had snagged their nets on the wreck over the years. Families and descendants of the crew traveled to the site and laid a wreath and poppies on the waters above the wreck. The sole remaining survivor of the sinking, John Stone, was unable to make the journey from his home in southern Victoria.

Sinking of Starr King

On 11 February 1943, I-21 sank the 7,176 GRT U.S. Liberty Ship Starr King near Port Macquarie.

Other ships damaged or sunk along the Australian east coast
On 12 November 1943 the troopship  was torpedoed near the Fiji Islands while sailing from San Francisco to Townsville and sank the next day. Injured and others were taken off by Edwin T. Meredith.

Loss
I-21 was never sighted again following a final report made on 27 November 1943, off the Gilbert Islands. A Japanese Type B submarine, which was probably I-21, was torpedoed and sunk by TBF Avengers off Tarawa on 29 November 1943.

References

Bibliography

External links
 Sinking of the SS Cape San Juan
 An account from HMAS Mildura, including the sinking of the Iron Knight and other vessels attacked by I-21.
 Cyber Diver News Network, account of the discovery of the Iron Knight
 ABC Stateline ACT, transcript of the Iron Knight documentary, researched and written by Craig Allen, and aired by ABC Canberra on Friday 4 August 2006.
 ABC Australia Wide, the video of the Iron Knight news story that aired on ABC Television and ABC Australia Wide on the discovery of the Iron Knight.
 Sinking of the USS Montebello

Type B1 submarines
Ships built by Kawasaki Heavy Industries
1940 ships
World War II submarines of Japan
Japanese submarines lost during World War II
World War II shipwrecks in the Pacific Ocean
Maritime incidents in November 1943
Missing submarines of World War II